Genovés may refer to:

Places 
 El Genovés, Valencia, town at the Valencian Community, Spain.

Persons 
 Paco Cabanes Pastor, Genovés I, Valencian pilotari.
 José Cabanes, Genovés II, Valencian pilotari.